Located in the eastern section of Westmoreland County and on the north side of Latrobe, Pennsylvania, Latrobe Hospital has 188 inpatient beds. It also has a ten-bed behavioral health unit. A variety of outpatient services, including a sleep disorders center, are at this hospital. The hospital has a number of buildings on site, including its Occupational Medicine building, at 121 W. 2nd Street. Latrobe is owned by Excela Health.

Latrobe was founded in 1907 and is today considered to be a teaching hospital. In 1974 a family medicine residency program was started there. It is affiliated with the Jefferson Medical College of Thomas Jefferson University.

Latrobe Hospital rating data
The HealthGrades website contains the latest quality data for Excela Health Latrobe Hospital, as of 2015. For this rating section three different types of data from HealthGrades are presented: quality ratings for twenty-four inpatient conditions and procedures, eleven patient safety indicators, percentage of patients giving the hospital a 9 or 10 (the two highest possible ratings).

For inpatient conditions and procedures, there are three possible ratings: worse than expected, as expected, better than expected.  For this hospital the data for this category is:
Worse than expected - 6
As expected - 10
Better than expected - 8
For patient safety indicators, there are the same three possible ratings. For this hospital safety indicators were rated as:
Worse than expected - 1
As expected -11
Better than expected - 2

Data for patients giving this hospital a 9 or 10 are:
Patients rating this hospital as a 9 or 10 - 69%
Patients rating hospitals as a 9 or 10 nationally - 69%

References

Buildings and structures in Westmoreland County, Pennsylvania
Hospitals in Pennsylvania